Milcote railway station was a station on the Great Western Railway line between  and , which in 1908 became part of the Great Western Railway's new main line between Birmingham and Cheltenham.

This was, and is, a very lightly populated district, and at the time of the station's opening there was scarcely another building in sight. Most of Milcote's passenger traffic must have been expected to be to or from the nearby villages of Weston on Avon and Welford on Avon. The station's nameboards at the time of its eventual closure read "Milcote for Weston and Welford".

History
It consisted of a station building, a single passenger platform, and two goods sidings, all on the south side of the road linking Weston and Clifford Chambers, which crossed the line here via a level crossing. A signal box was added in 1891–92: previously the station's signals and points appear to have been operated from a frame either on the platform itself or inside the main station building. In 1908 the Great Western Railway doubled the line between Stratford and Honeybourne as part of its new through route between Birmingham and Cheltenham via Stratford, and a new two-platformed station was built on the north side of the crossing. The original building, with its station master's house, was retained.

5,077 passengers were recorded in 1903. Annual totals increased to 7,126 in 1913 and 9,399 in 1923, but fell to 5,151 in 1933. The increase in motor vehicle use led to passengers numbers at this rather isolated station decreasing still further after World War II. In 1956 British Railways reduced its status to that of an unstaffed halt. BR withdrew goods facilities from July 1963 and the station was closed to passenger traffic from January 1966. Trains continued to pass through the closed station until November 1976 when the line itself was closed. The tracks between Stratford and Long Marston were removed in 1979.

Greenway
The trackbed was disused for ten years until 1989 when, in a joint venture between Sustrans and Warwickshire County Council, it was converted to a greenway for cycling and walking.

References

Disused railway stations in Warwickshire
Former Great Western Railway stations
Railway stations in Great Britain opened in 1859
Railway stations in Great Britain closed in 1966
Beeching closures in England